The Ministry Forest Department of  Maharashtra is a Ministry of the Government of Maharashtra. It is headed Cabinet Minister by Sudhir Mungantiwar.

Head office

List of Cabinet Ministers

List of Ministers of State

References

Government ministries of Maharashtra
State forest departments of India